The Itzulia Women is a women's cycle stage race in Spain, part of the UCI Women's World Tour. The race takes place in the Basque Country autonomous community in Northern Spain, on tough, hilly roads - with the 2022 edition featuring thirteen climbs over 3 stages.

History 
The Tour of the Basque Country is a longstanding men's stage race, being first held in 1924. In 2019, a one-day race for professional women was held on a similar course to the Clásica de San Sebastián. In 2021, a 'Tour of the Basque Country' for women was proposed to replace the women's Clásica de San Sebastián. 

The first edition of Itzulia Women took place in 2022, over 3 days, and was won by Demi Vollering. Euskadi Cycling Organisations President Julián Eraso was criticised by the organiser and local politicians for sexism, after he stated that "we have almost forced to organise [the race]; it's a matter of fashion".

Winners

External links

References 

Cycle races in Spain
Women's road bicycle races
Annual sporting events in Spain
Recurring sporting events established in 2022
2022 establishments in Spain
UCI Women's World Tour races
Cycle races in the Basque Country